Mirman School is an independent, co-educational school for highly gifted children located at 16180 Mulholland Drive in Bel-Air, Los Angeles, California, United States, with 330 pupils aged 5 to 14. Mirman School is accredited by the California Association of Independent Schools (CAIS) and the Western Association of Schools and Colleges WASC for grades K-8. Mirman is one of a handful of schools for the highly gifted (IQ of 138 or above) in the United States.

History 
Mirman School was founded in 1962 by Norman and Beverly Mirman, who started the school in their home.  A year later, the school expanded to a facility on Pico Boulevard, and classes were held there until the current Mulholland campus was opened in 1971. Soon after, the school expanded to contain a middle school located on the same campus.

School structure 
Mirman is one of a handful of schools for the highly gifted (IQ of 138 or above) in the United States. Instead of traditional grade levels,  Mirman School consists of a lower school and an upper school; the lower containing kindergarten through fourth grade, and the upper consisting of fifth grade through US4 (eighth grade). Each lower-school classroom contains approximately 18 students in kindergarten to 25 students in fourth grade. Many students leave after the second year of upper school and matriculate to a conventional seventh grade class. However, the administration of the school encourages students to stay through fourth year upper school when they can matriculate to either 9th or 10th grade, or in some instances seek early admission to various colleges.

Lower school
At the lower school, there are two classes for each academic level (or grade). Each class has a primary teacher and assistant teacher who instruct the students in reading, mathematics, English, history, thematic studies and other miscellaneous subjects. In addition, there are additional teacher/specialists who teach separate classes covering science, theatrics, music, computer skills, Mandarin, and Spanish.

Upper school
The upper school, in contrast, has no main teacher. Instead, each student takes eight different classes and moves among the classrooms throughout the day. Rather than storing all school supplies within a fixed desk, as the students do in lower school, upper school students have lockers as an area to store books and school supplies. The classes for the upper school are: Science, a World language (either Spanish, Latin, or Mandarin), Social Studies, English, Mathematics, P.E., Art, and two Electives. As for electives, students may choose to attend one elective which meets four days a week, or two different two-day-a-week electives. On Wednesday, the upper school has a program called LEAP (Learning Enhancement and Achievement Program) which gives students the ability to choose which classes they attend from a list of about 8 choices each period. The primary purpose of LEAP is to support the academic and artistic programs by providing students time for working on class assignments or independent projects. Students can also select classes that enhance the learning in all of their classes. Throughout the day there are a variety of choices available for all of the upper school students. It can also be used for taking missed tests, working on class assignments, or getting extra help wherever it is needed. LEAP has been an important part of the upper school curriculum for the past 20 years.

Trips 
Field trips are common at the Mirman Lower School. In the lower school, there are several field trips throughout the year. 4th grade and all Upper School grades take overnight trips during the school year. The fourth grade, fifth grade, and sixth grade trips are usually located at wilderness camps around Southern California.

Notable alumni

Academics 
Benjamin Karney, Professor of Social Psychology at UCLA
Eugene Volokh, Professor of Law at UCLA

Executives 
Nathan Myhrvold, Former CTO of Microsoft, Co-founder of Intellectual Ventures

Actors 
Crispin Glover, actor
Masi Oka, actor
Kristy Wu, actress
David Dorfman, actor
Lilla Crawford, actress
Elyse Seder, actress and motivational speaker

Other notables 
Dana Berliner, Litigation Director at the Institute for Justice
Alex Cohen, radio host
Philippe Cousteau, Jr., grandson of Jacques Cousteau
Charles Matthau, son of Walter Matthau 
Nick Sagan, son of Carl Sagan
Sho Yano, child prodigy
Madalyn Aslan, author
Christy Lemire, film critic and radio/podcast host
Charlaine Olmedo, Judge

References

External links 
 
 "Where Bright Minds Can Shine" by Elaine Woo, Los Angeles Times - 22 November 2000.

Gifted education
Schools in Los Angeles
Educational institutions established in 1962
Private middle schools in California
Private elementary schools in California
Bel Air, Los Angeles
1962 establishments in California